Brian Colin Dee (born 21 March 1936, London, England) is an English jazz pianist and former musical director.

Biography
Dee's musical career started in 1956 after his service with the Royal Air Force was finished.  He came to prominence in 1959, playing at Ronnie Scott's Jazz Club in Gerrard Street, London.  At that time he was playing with Lennie Best, Dave Morse and Vic Ash.

He later joined the Jazz Five and played opposite Miles Davis on a nationwide tour and was voted Melody Maker's 'New Star of 1960'. He also appeared at the Establishment Club in 1962 where his trio played opposite Dudley Moore.

Throughout an uninterrupted career, Dee has played with many jazz musicians, including Ben Webster, Zoot Sims, Al Cohn, Benny Carter, Harry "Sweets" Edison, Eddie "Lockjaw" Davis, Chet Baker, Al Grey, Sonny Stitt, Victor Feldman and Joe Newman.

From the late 1960s onwards, Dee was in demand as a session musician, appearing on many orchestral recordings. Subsequently, he went on to play with the Ted Heath orchestra, for the last 10 years of its existence under the direction of the late Don Lusher. Dee was also a member of Laurie Johnson's London Big Band.

Renowned as a fine accompanist to singers, Dee has recorded or appeared alongside Bing Crosby, Fred Astaire, Johnny Mercer, Elton John (Dee played organ and/or harmonium on four of John's early albums), Peggy Lee, Frankie Laine, Joe Williams, Jimmy Witherspoon, Mark Murphy, Cleo Laine and Annie Ross.

He was also musical director to Lita Roza, Cilla Black, Rosemary Squires, and Elaine Delmar.

References

1936 births
Living people
English jazz pianists
English session musicians
20th-century British pianists
21st-century pianists
Musicians from London